Glosli is a village in the eastern part of Fredrikstad municipality, Norway. Its population (SSB 2005) is 613.

Villages in Østfold